The tennis competition at the 2015 Pacific Games was held from 6 to 17 July 2015 at the Port Moresby Racquets Club in Port Moresby, Papua New Guinea.

Participating nations
Fourteen countries and territories participated in the games.Each Pacific Games association was allowed to enter a maximum of eight athletes, with no more than five of the same gender.

Medal summary

Medal table

Men's

Women's

Mixed

See also
 Tennis at the Pacific Games

References

2015 Pacific Games
2015
Pacific Games